Abdul Rachman Saleh Airport  is a small class 1 commercial airport serving Malang, the second largest city in East Java province of Indonesia.  This airport is named after Abdoel Rachman Saleh (1909–1947), an Indonesian aviator and physiologist whose aircraft was shot down by the Dutch while landing in Maguwo Airfield (now Adisucipto International Airport), Sleman Regency, Special Region of Yogyakarta, during the Indonesian National Revolution.

The airport was temporarily closed in October 2009 due to numerous damage found in the runway, but has opened again after some repairs were done, as a result of Rp 130 million funding by three local authorities.

The new terminal was opened on 30 December 2011, replacing the old terminal that is now used by the Indonesian Air Force (TNI-AU).  The new terminal is located near the south-west end of the runway, adjacent to the old terminal.

History

Airlines and destinations

The following airlines offer scheduled passenger service:

Statistics

Accidents and incidents
On 18 January 1967, a Grumman HU-16A Albatross operated by the Air Force of the Republic of Indonesia (AURI), military registration 302, en route to Malang-Abdul Rachman Saleh Airport (MLG/WARA), was reported as missing with the loss of all 19 occupants onboard.
On 1 November 2007, at 13:24 Western Indonesia Time (WIB) (06:24 UTC), a Boeing 737-230 operated by Mandala Airlines as flight number RI260 (also reported as MDL 260) (serial number: 22137/788), registration PK-RIL, was written off following substantial damage resulting from a severe heavy landing on runway 35 at Abdul Rachman Saleh Airport.  Originating from Jakarta-Soekarno-Hatta International Airport (CGK/WIII) on a scheduled passenger service, the subsequent investigation found that the pilot failed to observe the excessive 1,000 feet per minute rate of descent during the approach for landing, thus creating an unstabilised approach.  The 45 year old male pilot in command was criticised for further failing to respond to any of the audible warnings from any of ground proximity warning systems (GPWS), particularly the initial "Sink Rate, Sink Rate" and the three subsequent "Pull Up, Pull Up" aural warnings.  Data recovered from the flight data recorder revealed that after a rate of descent of 1,750 feet per minute, the aircraft bounced around  following the severe heavy landing, and that there was no attempt by the crew to initiate a go around, which is the normal recovery action following a heavy landing.  In mitigation, the flight crew were hampered with "marginal visual meteorological conditions" during their approach, specifically heavy rain and reduced visibility.  Of the 94 total persons onboard (two pilots, three cabin crew, and 89 passengers), there were no fatalities and no serious injuries.

References

External links

Live arrival and departure data for Malang Abdul Rachman Saleh Airport (MLG/WARA) — at Flightradar24.com
WARA Abdul Rachman Saleh Airport - live flight tracking — at FlightAware.com
METAR WARA - Abdul Rachman Saleh Airport — live weather report, from METAR-Taf.com
History of Malang Abdul Rachman Saleh Airport — at Bandara.co.id 

Photograph of damage caused heavy landing at MLG to Mandala Airlines RI260 Boeing 737-230 Advanced PK-RIL — from NTSC (KNKT) at Aviation-Safety.net

Airports in East Java
Transport in East Java
Indonesian Air Force bases